This page shows the results of the 2004 Men's Central American and Caribbean Basketball Championship, also known as the 2004 Centrobasket, which was held in the city of Santo Domingo, Dominican Republic from July 7 to July 11, 2004.

Competing nations

Preliminary round

2004-07-07

2004-07-08

2004-07-09

 

2004-07-07

2004-07-08

2004-07-09

Consolidation round
2004-07-10 — 5th/8th place

2003-06-20 — 1st/4th place

Final round
2004-07-11 — 7th/8th place

2004-07-11 — 5th/6th place

2004-07-11 — 3rd/4th place

2004-07-11 — 1st/2nd place

Final ranking

1. 

2. 

3. 

4. 

5. 

6. 

7. 

8.

Individual awards
MVP: 
Best Scorers:  and 
Best Rebounder: 
Best Assist: 
All-Star Team:
Point guard: 
Shooting guard: 
Small forward: 
Power forward: 
Center:

References
LatinBasket
Results

Centrobasket
2004–05 in North American basketball
2004 in Central American sport
2004 in Caribbean sport
2004 in Dominican Republic sport
International basketball competitions hosted by the Dominican Republic
July 2004 sports events in North America
Sports competitions in Santo Domingo
21st century in Santo Domingo